is a computer program that simulates inundation for rivers, flood plains and urban drainage systems. It dynamically couples 1D (MIKE 11 and Mouse) and 2D (MIKE 21) modeling techniques into one single tool. MIKE FLOOD is developed by DHI. 

MIKE FLOOD is accepted by US Federal Emergency Management Agency (FEMA) for use in the National Flood Insurance Program (NFIP).

MIKE FLOOD can be expanded with a range of modules and methods including a flexible mesh overland flow solver, MIKE URBAN, Rainfall-runoff modeling and dynamic operation of structures.

Applications
MIKE FLOOD can be used for river-flood plain interaction, integrated urban drainage and river modeling, urban flood analysis and detailed dam break studies.

Integrated hydrologic modelling
Hydraulic engineering
Environmental engineering
Physical geography